Meltem Hocaoğlu (born January 15, 1992) is a Turkish karateka competing in the kumite +68 kg division.

She won one of the bronze medals in the women's +68 kg event at the 2022 Mediterranean Games held in Oran, Algeria. She won the silver medal in her event at the 2021 Islamic Solidarity Games held in Konya, Turkey.

Achievements

2012
  European Championships – 13 May, Tenerife, ESP – kumite +68 kg,
  World Championships – 25 November, Paris, FRA – Team kumite,

2013
  Mediterranean Games – 29 June, Mersin, TUR – kumite +68 kg,

2014
  World Championships – 29 June, Bremen, GER – Team kumite,

2015
  European Championships – 21 March, Istanbul, TUR – kumite +68 kg,
  European Games – 14 June, Baku, AZE – kumite +68 kg,

2017
  European Championships – 6 May, İzmit, TUR – kumite +68 kg,

References

Living people
1992 births
Turkish female karateka
Competitors at the 2013 Mediterranean Games
Competitors at the 2018 Mediterranean Games
Competitors at the 2022 Mediterranean Games
Mediterranean Games medalists in karate
Mediterranean Games gold medalists for Turkey
Mediterranean Games bronze medalists for Turkey
Karateka at the 2015 European Games
Karateka at the 2019 European Games
European Games medalists in karate
European Games silver medalists for Turkey
Islamic Solidarity Games medalists in karate
Islamic Solidarity Games competitors for Turkey
Karateka at the 2020 Summer Olympics
Olympic karateka of Turkey
21st-century Turkish sportswomen